Hornsjön, also known as Hornsviken, is the largest lake on the island of Öland, Sweden.

The lake lies in Horns Kungsgård, one of the protected areas in the Natura 2000 network.

References

Natura 2000 in Sweden
Öland
Lakes of Kalmar County